81st Street may refer to:

81st Street (Manhattan), New York City
81st Street (IRT Ninth Avenue Line), New York City

See also
81st Street – Museum of Natural History (IND Eighth Avenue Line)